Renuka Arun is a classical music singer and play back singer in Malayalam and Telugu. She is the Gulf-Andhra Music Award (GAMA) winner for the best playback singer in Telugu for the year 2017.

Renuka is a veteran of Carnatic music circuit, with more than 550 concerts to her credit. She started her music lessons at the age of 4. She gained instant popularity with the rendering of song 'Endaro' in the Telugu movie Bhale Bhale Magadivoy

In addition to her Performances of Carnatic music and film playback singing, Renuka teaches music at a music school in Ernakulam. She is a regular columnist on music in Mathrubhumi news paper

Early life and career
Renuka was born in Perumbavoor in Kerala. She works as an IT professional. Renuka conducted her first concert while in grade 7. Renuka was a regular in fusion music scene in Kerala. She was also involved with Flamenco dancer Bettina's group of fusion music. She has been learning music under the tutelage of Chandramana Narayanan Namboodiri for the last 30 years

Playback singer

Notable film songs
Renuka gained wide spread accolades for the song Endaro and Sitha Kalayanam

Telugu songs

Malayalam songs

Awards and nominations

References

External links

 Renuka Arun on m3db.com

Living people
Indian women playback singers
Women musicians from Kerala
1981 births
Singers from Kerala
Women Carnatic singers
Carnatic singers
21st-century Indian women singers
21st-century Indian singers